Cheyenne County (county code CN) is a county located in the northwest corner of the U.S. state of Kansas. As of the 2020 census, the county population was 2,616. Its county seat and most populous city is St. Francis.

History

Early history

For many millennia, the Great Plains of North America was inhabited by nomadic Native Americans.  From the 16th century to 18th century, the Kingdom of France claimed ownership of large parts of North America.  In 1762, after the French and Indian War, France secretly ceded New France to Spain, per the Treaty of Fontainebleau.

19th century
In 1802, Spain returned most of the land to France, but keeping title to about 7,500 square miles.  In 1803, most of the land for modern day Kansas was acquired by the United States from France as part of the 828,000 square mile Louisiana Purchase for 2.83 cents per acre.

In 1854, the Kansas Territory was organized, then in 1861 Kansas became the 34th U.S. state.  In 1873, Cheyenne County was established.

Geography

Adjacent counties
 Dundy County, Nebraska (north/Mountain Time border)
 Rawlins County (east)
 Sherman County (south/Mountain Time border)
 Kit Carson County, Colorado (southwest/Mountain Time border)
 Yuma County, Colorado (west/Mountain Time border)

Major highways
Sources:  National Atlas, U.S. Census Bureau
 U.S. Route 36
 Kansas Highway 27
 Kansas Highway 161

Time Zones

The county is in the Central Time zone, but is bordered by the Mountain Time Zone in three directions; it is the only county in the United States to have this characteristic. Dundy County, Nebraska to the north, Yuma County, Colorado and Kit Carson County, Colorado to the west, and Sherman County to the south are all located in the Mountain Time Zone. As a result, Rawlins County is Cheyenne County's only neighbor to also observe Central Time.

Demographics

As of the 2000 census, there were 3,165 people, 1,360 households, and 919 families residing in the county.  The population density was 3 people per square mile (1/km2).  There were 1,636 housing units at an average density of 2 per square mile (1/km2).  The racial makeup of the county was 97.91% White, 0.13% Black or African American, 0.09% Native American, 0.32% Asian, 0.03% Pacific Islander, 0.98% from other races, and 0.54% from two or more races. Hispanic or Latino of any race were 2.59% of the population.

There were 1,360 households, out of which 27.60% had children under the age of 18 living with them, 60.10% were married couples living together, 5.10% had a female householder with no husband present, and 32.40% were non-families. 30.80% of all households were made up of individuals, and 17.30% had someone living alone who was 65 years of age or older.  The average household size was 2.29 and the average family size was 2.85.

In the county, the population was spread out, with 23.80% under the age of 18, 5.10% from 18 to 24, 22.70% from 25 to 44, 21.80% from 45 to 64, and 26.60% who were 65 years of age or older.  The median age was 44 years. For every 100 females there were 97.30 males.  For every 100 females age 18 and over, there were 92.40 males.

The median income for a household in the county was $30,599, and the median income for a family was $34,816. Males had a median income of $24,976 versus $19,569 for females. The per capita income for the county was $17,862.  About 7.40% of families and 9.40% of the population were below the poverty line, including 11.80% of those under age 18 and 6.70% of those age 65 or over.

Government

Presidential elections
Cheyenne County is a Republican stronghold. Only four Republican presidential candidates from 1888 to the present day have failed to carry the county, the most recent of which ironically being Kansas Governor Alf Landon in 1936 as he also failed to win the state's electoral votes.

Laws
Following amendment to the Kansas Constitution in 1986, the county remained a prohibition, or "dry", county until 2000, when voters approved the sale of alcoholic liquor by the individual drink with a 30% food sales requirement.

Education

Unified school districts
 Cheylin USD 103
 St. Francis Schools USD 297

Communities

Cities
 Bird City
 St. Francis

Unincorporated communities
 Wheeler

Ghost towns
 Calhoun
 Hourglass
 Jaqua
 Lawnridge
 Marney
 Orlando

Townships
Cheyenne County is divided into seven townships.  None of the cities within the county are considered governmentally independent, and all figures for the township include those of the cities.  In the following table, the population center is the largest city (or cities) included in that township's population total, if it is of a significant size.

See also

References

Further reading

 Standard Atlas of Cheyenne County, Kansas; Geo. A. Ogle & Co; 48 pages; 1907.

External links

County
 
 Cheyenne County - Directory of Public Officials
Maps
 Cheyenne County Maps: Current, Historic, KDOT
 Kansas Highway Maps: Current, Historic, KDOT
 Kansas Railroad Maps: Current, 1996, 1915, KDOT and Kansas Historical Society

 
Kansas counties
Kansas placenames of Native American origin
1873 establishments in Kansas
Populated places established in 1873